MHV  may refer to:
 MHV Amplitudes (particle physics) - maximally helicity violating amplitudes
 MHV connector (electronics) - miniature high voltage RF connector
 Mojave Air & Space Port, FAA and IATA code
 Mouse hepatitis virus